Fertiana is a townland in the civil parish of the same name in County Tipperary.

References

Townlands of County Tipperary
Eliogarty